The World Pastry Cup (French:Coupe du Monde de la Pâtisserie) is an international pastry contest taking place every two years in Lyon, France.

Qualification for the Cup is via national competitions, such as the Campionato Italiano di Pasticceria Seniores, where the winners are chosen to take part in the World Pastry Cup.

Results

Medal count

References

External links 
 Official website

Pastries
Cooking competitions in France
Lyon